Jamie Michael Robert Sanderson (born 24 November 1987 in South Shields, England), known professionally as Sermstyle, is a British singer, songwriter, record producer, and remixer who lives and works from Los Angeles.

Recognition
Sermstyle was featured on BBC Radio 1 & BBC Radio 1Xtra The UK Producers documentary which first aired 26 September 2011.

In December 2011, Sermstyle featured in the BBC documentary Grime Up North, where, BBC 1xtra DJ, Charlie Sloth "went on a road-trip to find the hottest rappers up North and try to understand why rap music in the UK is dominated by the London scene." Charlie travels to Newcastle to meet Sermstyle to be introduced to some of Newcastle's rap artists.

Sermstyle signed to Mike Caren's publishing company Artist Publishing Group in January 2013.

In the Songsplits Top 100 producers in the world, Sermstyle was ranked 86th.

Sermstyle received an ASCAP Pop Music Award for "Timber" at the 32nd Annual ASCAP Pop Music Awards.

Sermstyle was nominated for a 2017 Latin Grammy award, for the song "Hey Ma", which featured on The Fate of the Furious soundtrack.

Commercial discography

Mixtape discography

References

1987 births
Living people
English record producers
English male singer-songwriters
21st-century English singers
21st-century British male singers